The Cleveland Abbe House, also known as the Timothy Caldwell House and Monroe-Adams-Abbe House, is a historic house at 2017 "I" Street NW in Washington, D.C. Built in 1805, it is a good example of Federal period architecture, and has had a series of distinguished residents. Most notable are James Monroe, who occupied it as United States Secretary of War and as President of the United States while the White House was restored after the War of 1812, and historian Henry Adams. However, it was designated a National Historic Landmark in 1975 for its association with meteorologist Cleveland Abbe (1838–1916), the founder of the National Weather Service, who lived here from 1877 until his death. It is now home to the Arts Club of Washington.

Description and history
The Cleveland Abbe House stands on the George Washington University campus northwest of the White House, on the north side of "I" Street across from James Monroe Park and near its junction with Pennsylvania Avenue. It is a three-story brick row house, built out of red brick and topped by a dormered gable roof. It is four bays wide, with the entrance in the leftmost bay. Windows are rectangular sash, with stone sills and splayed keystone lintels. A stone stringcourse separates each of the floors from the next. The main entrance has an elaborate Federal surround, with sidelight windows and a large half-round transom window. The interior of the house retains original Federal period finishes.

History
Timothy Caldwell built the house around 1802 to 1805. James Monroe lived there from 1811 to 1817, a period during which he was Secretary of State and War Secretary. From his inauguration as America's fifth President in March 1817 until the White House was fully restored in September 1817, the Cleveland Abbe House served as the Presidential residence. In the 1820s, the house was occupied by the British legation. Henry Adams lived here with his parents, Charles Francis Adams Sr., and Abigail Brooks, in 1860 to 1861.

Cleveland Abbe, founder of the U.S. Weather Bureau, lived here from 1877 to 1909. It was during his ownership that a number of alterations were made to the house. After Abbe's death in 1916, the Arts Club of Washington purchased the building.

The house was listed on the National Register of Historic Places as "Arts Club of Washington" in 1969. It was declared a National Historic Landmark as "Cleveland Abbe House" in 1975.

See also
 List of National Historic Landmarks in Washington, D.C.
 National Register of Historic Places listings in central Washington, D.C.

References

External links
 Cleveland Abbe House, NHL summary at the National Park Service
 Abbe House (Arts Club of Washington), NRHP Travel itinerary listing at the National Park Service
 Arts Club of Washington - History of the Cleveland Abbe House

National Historic Landmarks in Washington, D.C.
Houses completed in 1802
Houses on the National Register of Historic Places in Washington, D.C.
Foggy Bottom
Federal architecture in Washington, D.C.